Ionic conductivity may refer to:

 Conductivity (electrolytic), electrical conductivity due to an electrolyte separating into ions in solution
 Ionic conductivity (solid state), electrical conductivity due to ions moving position in a crystal lattice
Fast ion conductor